The Billboard Tropical Albums chart, published in Billboard magazine, is a record chart that features Latin music sales information. This data are compiled by Nielsen SoundScan from a sample that includes music stores, as well as music departments at electronics and department stores and verifiable sales from concert venues in the United States.

The Tropical Albums chart was first of the three Latin-related charts (along with Latin Pop Albums and Regional Mexican Albums) published on June 29, 1985, eight years before the Top Latin Album survey which began on July 10, 1993. The data for this chart was published every two weeks, unlike most Billboard charts.

At the time of the chart's introduction, a softer form of salsa known as salsa romantica had emerged in the mid-1980s. This new form of salsa led musicians such as Eddie Santiago, Frankie Ruiz, and Luis Enrique to dominate the chart throughout the 1980s.

The first album to reach number-one on the Tropical Albums chart was Innovations by Puerto Rican musician group, El Gran Combo de Puerto Rico. The album remained number-one for 12 (on a bi weekly rotation) weeks until being replaced by their next album, Y Su Pueblo. Romantico y Sabroso, another studio album by the group that reached number-one on the Tropical Albums chart was their crossover attempt in the salsa romantica genre. In addition, a compilation album related to the group reach number-one on the chart.

Frankie Ruiz became the first solo performer to reach number-one with his debut album, Solista Pero No Solo. Two other album by Ruiz including Voy Pa' Encima and a compilation album reached number-one the Tropical Album charts.

Cuban duo performers Hansel & Raul reached number-one with their album, La Magia de.

Three albums by Eddie Santiago reached number-one on the Tropical Album chart. The first album was Atrevido y Diferente which was the debut album for Santiago.  The follow-up album, Sigo Atrevido was the second album to reach number-one on the chart and received a Grammy Award-nomination for Best Tropical Latin Performance.

Salsa bandleader Tommy Olivencia released an album to commemorate the 30th anniversary of the group's history which reached number-one on the Tropical Album chart. Frankie Ruiz and Lalo Rodriguez were former members of Olivencia's band. The latter of the two also reached number-one with his album, Un Nuevo Despertar.

One compilation album featuring various artists was released by Rodven Records and reached number-one on the chart.

Near the end of the decade, Nicaraguan salsa singer Luis Enrique released two album that reached number-one on the chart. His debut album, Amor y Alegria became his first number-one on the chart, while his next album was the last Tropical album to chart in the 1980s.

Number one albums
Key
 – Best-selling Latin album of the year

References
General

 For information about every week of this chart for the 1980s, follow this link; in the chart date section select a date and the top ten positions for the week selected will appear on screen, including the number-one album, which is shown in the table above.

Specific

Tropical 1980s
United States Tropical Albums
1980s in Latin music
Tropical music albums